Dubishki is a village in Moshenskoy District of Novgorod Oblast, Russia.

References

Rural localities in Novgorod Oblast
Borovichsky Uyezd